A gospel harmony is an attempt to compile the canonical gospels of the Christian New Testament into a single account. This may take the form either of a single, merged narrative, or a tabular format with one column for each gospel, technically known as a synopsis, although the word harmony is often used for both.

Harmonies are constructed for a variety of purposes: to create a readable and accessible piece of literature for the general public, to establish a scholarly chronology of events in the life of Jesus as depicted in the canonical gospels, or to better understand how the accounts relate to each other.

Among academics, the construction of harmonies has been favoured by conservative scholars, though one scholar, B. S. Childs, opposes this. Students of higher criticism see the divergences between the gospel accounts as reflecting the construction of traditions by the early Christian communities. Among modern academics, attempts to construct a single story have largely been abandoned in favour of laying out the accounts in parallel columns for comparison, to allow critical study of the differences between them.

The earliest known harmony is the Diatessaron by Tatian in the 2nd century and variations based on the Diatessaron continued to appear in the Middle Ages. The 16th century witnessed a major increase in the introduction of gospel harmonies and the parallel column structure became widespread. At this time visual representations also started appearing, depicting the life of Christ in terms of a "pictorial gospel harmony", and the trend continued into the 19th–20th centuries.

Overview
A gospel harmony is an attempt to collate the Christian canonical gospels into a single account. Harmonies are constructed by some writers in order to make the gospel story available to a wider audience, both religious and secular. Harmonies can be studied by scholars to establish a coherent chronology of the events depicted in the four canonical gospels in the life of Jesus, to better understand how the accounts relate to each other, and to critically evaluate their differences.

The terms harmony and synopsis have been used to refer to several different approaches to consolidating the canonical gospels.  Technically, a "harmony" weaves together sections of scripture into a single narrative, merging the four gospels. There are four main types of harmony: radical, synthetic, sequential and parallel. By contrast, a "synopsis", much like a parallel harmony, juxtaposes similar texts or accounts in parallel format, synchronized by time, while preserving their individual identity, usually in columns. Harmonies may also take a visual form and be undertaken to create narratives for artistic purposes, as in the creation of picture compositions depicting the life of Christ.

The oldest approach to harmonizing consists of merging the stories into a single narrative, producing a text longer than any individual gospel. This creates the most straightforward and detailed account, and one that is likely to be most accessible to non-academic users, such as lay churchgoers or people who are reading the gospels as a work of literature or philosophy.

There are, however, difficulties in the creation of a consolidated narrative. As John Barton points out, it is impossible to construct a single account from the four gospels without changing at least some parts of the individual accounts.

One challenge with any form of harmonizing is that events are sometimes described in a different order in different accounts – the Synoptic Gospels, for instance, describe Jesus overturning tables in the Temple at Jerusalem in the last week of his life, whereas the Gospel of John records a counterpart event only towards the beginning of Jesus's ministry. Harmonists must either choose which time they think is correct, or conclude that separate events are described. Lutheran theologian Andreas Osiander, for instance, proposed in Harmonia evangelica (1537) that Jesus must have been crowned with thorns twice, and that there were three separate episodes of cleansing of the Temple.  On the other hand, commentators have long noted that the individual gospels are not written in a rigorously chronological format.  This means that an event can be described as falling at two different times and still be the same event, so that the substantive details can be properly brought together in a harmony, although the harmonist will still have the task of deciding which of the two times is more probable.

A less common but more serious difficulty arises if the gospels diverge in their substantive description of an event.  An example is the incident involving the centurion whose servant is healed at a distance. In the Gospel of Matthew the centurion comes to Jesus in person; in the Luke version he sends Jewish elders. Since these accounts are clearly describing the same event, the harmonist must decide which is the more accurate description or else devise a composite account.

The modern academic view, based on the broadly accepted principle that Matthew and Luke were written using Mark as a source, seeks to explain the differences between the texts in terms of this process of composition. For example, Mark describes John the Baptist as preaching the forgiveness of sins, a detail which is dropped by Matthew, perhaps in the belief that the forgiveness of sins was exclusive to Jesus.

The modern popularizing view, on the other hand, while acknowledging these difficulties, deemphasizes their importance. This view suggests that the divergences in the gospels are a relatively small part of the whole, and that the accounts show a great deal of overall similarity. The divergences can therefore be sufficiently discussed in footnote in the course of a consolidated narrative, and need not stand in the way of conveying a better overall view of the life of Jesus or of making this material more accessible to a wider readership.

To illustrate the concept of parallel harmony, a simple example of a "synopsis fragment" is shown here, consisting of just four episodes from the Passion. A more comprehensive parallel harmony appears in a section below.

Early Church and Middle Ages

Tatian's influential Diatessaron, which dates to about AD 160, was perhaps the very first harmony. The Diatessaron reduced the number of verses in the four gospels from 3,780 to 2,769 without missing any event of teaching in the life of Jesus from any of the gospels. Some scholars believe Tatian may have drawn on one or more noncanonical gospels. The Gospel of the Ebionites, composed about the same time, is believed to have been a gospel harmony.

Variations based on the Diatessaron continued to appear in the Middle Ages, e.g. Codex Sangallensis (based on the 6th century Codex Fuldensis) dates to 830 and has a Latin column based on the Vulgate and an Old High German column that often resembles the Diatessaron, although errors frequently appear within it. The Liege harmony in the Limburg dialect (Liege University library item 437) is a key Western source of the Diatessaron and dates to 1280, although published much later. The two extant recensions of the Diatessaron in Medieval Italian are the single manuscript Venetian from the 13th or 14th century and the 26 manuscript Tuscan from the 14–15th century.

In the 3rd century Ammonius of Alexandria developed the forerunner of modern synopsis (perhaps based on the Diatessaron) as the Ammonian Sections in which he started with the text of Matthew and copied along parallel events. There are no extant copies of the harmony of Ammonius and it is only known from a single reference in the letter of Eusebius to Carpianus. In the letter Eusebius also discusses his own approach, i.e. the Eusebian Canons in which the texts of the gospels are shown in parallel to help comparison among the four gospels.

In the 5th century, Augustine of Hippo wrote extensively on the subject in his book Harmony of the Gospels. Augustine viewed the variations in the gospel accounts in terms of the different focuses of the authors on Jesus: Matthew on royalty, Mark on humanity, Luke on priesthood and John on divinity.

Clement of Llanthony's Unum ex Quatuor (One from Four) was considered an improvement on previous canons at the time, although modern scholars sometimes opine that no major advances beyond Augustine emerged on the topic until the 15th century. Throughout the Middle Ages harmonies based on the principles of the Diatessaron continued to appear, e.g. the Liege harmony by Plooij in Middle Dutch, and the Pepysian harmony in Middle English. The Pepysian harmony (Magdalene college, Cambridge, item Pepys 2498) dates to about 1400 and its name derives from having been owned by Samuel Pepys.

15th–20th centuries

In the 15th and the 16th centuries some new approaches to harmony began to appear, e.g. Jean Gerson produced a harmony which gave priority to the Gospel of John. Cornelius Jansen (Bishop of Ghent) also published his harmony (1549), focusing on the four gospels and even referring to the Acts of the Apostles. On the other hand John Calvin's approach focused on the three synoptic Gospels, and excluded the Gospel of John.

By this time visual representations had also started appearing, for instance, the 15th-century artist Lieven de Witte produced a set of about 200 woodcut images that depicted the Life of Christ in terms of a "pictorial gospel harmony" which then appeared in Willem van Branteghem's harmony published in Antwerp in 1537. The importance of imagery is reflected in the title of Branteghem's well known work: The Life of Jesus Christ Skillfully Portrayed in Elegant Pictures Drawn from the Narratives of the Four Evangelists

The 16th century witnessed a major increase in the introduction of gospel harmonies. In this period the parallel column structure became widespread, partly in response to the rise of biblical criticism. This new format was used to emphasize the trustworthiness of the gospels. It is not clear who produced the very first parallel harmony, but Gerhard Mercator's 1569 system is a well-known example. In terms of content and quality, Johann Jacob Griesbach's 1776 synopsis was a notable case.

At the same time, the rise of modern biblical criticism was instrumental in the decline of the traditional apologetic gospel harmony. The Enlightenment writer, Gotthold Ephraim Lessing, observed:

W. G. Rushbrooke's 1880 Synopticon is at times considered a turning point in the history of the synopsis, as it was based on Markan priority, i.e. the assumption that the Gospel of Mark was the first to be written. Thirteen years later, John Broadus used historical accounts to assign priorities in his harmony, while previous approaches had used feasts as the major milestones for dividing the life of Christ.

Towards the end of the 19th century, after extensive travels and study in the Middle East, James Tissot produced a set of 350 watercolors which depicted the life of Christ as a visual gospel harmony. Tissot synthesized the four gospels into a singular narrative with five chapters: "the Holy Childhood, the Ministry, Holy Week, the Passion, and the Resurrection". He also made portraits of each of the four evangelists to honor them.

In the 20th century, the Synopsis of the Four Gospels by Kurt Aland came to be seen by some as "perhaps the standard for an in-depth study of the Gospels." A key feature of Aland's work is the incorporation of the full text of the Gospel of John. John Bernard Orchard's synopsis (which has the same title) was of note in that it took the unusual approach of abandoning Markan priority and assuming the synopics were written with Matthean priority and Markan posteriority
.

An example parallel harmony
The following table is an example of a parallel harmony. The order of events, especially during the ministry period, has been the subject of speculation and scholarly debate. The order below is based on those of Anglican William Newcome in 1778 and Baptists Steven L. Cox and Kendell H Easley in 2006.

See also
 Jefferson Bible
 Ministry of Jesus
 Timeline of the Bible

References

Citations

Bibliography

 
 
 
 This article incorporates work from A Harmony of the Gospels in Greek by Edward Robinson, a publication now in the public domain.

Further reading
 Thomson, Charles, A Synopsis of the Four Evangelists (1815)
 Robinson, Edward, Greek Harmony of the Gospels (1845; second edition, 1851)
 Robinson, Edward, English Harmony of the Gospels (1846)
 Orville Daniel, A Harmony of the Four Gospels, 2nd Ed, Baker Books Pub, 1996.
 R. Thomas & S. Gundry, The NIV Harmony of the Gospels, HarperCollins Pub, 1988.

External links

 Augustine's Harmony of the Gospels
 Parallel Gospels in Harmony Online version of Parallel Gospels in Harmony: with Study Guide, by David A. Reed, a public domain book
 Complete Gospel texts, shown in four parallel columns, but not a harmony

1st-century Christianity
Chronology
Gospels

Canonical Gospels
Christian terminology